Blue Mountain is a  mountain summit located within Olympic National Park in Clallam County of Washington state. Blue Mountain is situated in the Daniel J. Evans Wilderness, 13 miles southeast of Port Angeles and 11 miles southwest of Sequim. The mountain's name is due to a soft, blue haze that forms around the mountain in the summer. New settlers to the Olympic Peninsula near the end of the 19th century brought devastating fires started by land clearing and logging activities. The Dungeness Fire of 1891 burned about 30,000 acres, destroying much of the forest around Blue Mountain.

Access is via the 19-mile Deer Park Road, and the summit can be reached by walking the half-mile Rain Shadow Loop Trail which gains 170 feet of elevation from road's end. The trail is so named because Blue Mountain lies within the rain shadow of the Olympic Mountains, receiving 50 inches of precipitation annually compared to more than 200 inches on Mount Olympus, 23 miles distant. Precipitation runoff from the mountain drains north to the Strait of Juan de Fuca via Maiden Creek, Siebert Creek, McDonald Creek, Canyon Creek, and Gray Wolf River. The summit offers a view of the San Juan Islands, Victoria across the strait on Vancouver Island, Canada, and on a clear day the eye can see as far as Mount Baker, 87 miles away. The endemic Olympic bellflower can be found near the summit.

Climate

Based on the Köppen climate classification, Blue Mountain is located in the marine west coast climate zone of western North America. Most weather fronts originate in the Pacific Ocean, and travel east toward the Olympic Mountains. As fronts approach, they are forced upward by the peaks of the Olympic Range, causing them to drop their moisture in the form of rain or snowfall (Orographic lift). As a result, the Olympics experience high precipitation, especially during the winter months. During winter months, weather is usually cloudy, but due to high pressure systems over the Pacific Ocean that intensify during summer months, there is often little or no cloud cover during the summer.

Geology

The Olympic Mountains are composed of obducted clastic wedge material and oceanic crust, primarily Eocene sandstone, turbidite, and basaltic oceanic crust. The mountains were sculpted during the Pleistocene era by erosion and glaciers advancing and retreating multiple times.

See also

 Olympic Mountains
 Geology of the Pacific Northwest

Gallery

References

External links

 
 Deer Park Area Brochure: National Park Service
 Blue Mountain: Mountain-forecast.com

Olympic Mountains
Mountains of Washington (state)
Mountains of Clallam County, Washington
Landforms of Olympic National Park
North American 1000 m summits